Tianjin REGO International School 'as a private international school in Tianjin, China.

The Tianjin Rego International School was founded in April 2000 with Martin Scott as founding Principal, in premises rented from the Tianjin Tourism Board. Its purpose was to reflect UK educational practice. The school was recognised by the UK Department for Education and Cambridge International Examinations, enabling it to offer IGCSE and 'A' Level qualifications.

The school moved to the Meijiang Area in 2003. The school closed in 2014 because the property owners could not pay the teachers due to lack of income..

References

External links 
 Rego school

British international schools in China
Cambridge schools in China
2000 establishments in China
Educational institutions established in 2000
International schools in Tianjin
High schools in Tianjin
Rego Europe Foundation Schools